The 2020–21 season is Bashundhara Kings's 8th season as a football club since its creation in 2013, and its 3rd consecutive season in the top-flight. In addition to domestic league, Bashundhara participated on this season's edition of Federation Cup and AFC Cup. The season covered the period from December 2020 to September 2021, with the late ending to the season due to the COVID-19 pandemic in Bangladesh.

Current squad

 (on loan from Fluminense)

Transfers

Transfers in

Loans in

Transfers out

Pre-season & friendlies
Legend

Maldives tour
In 2020, Bashundhara Kings were going to play two friendlies against TC Sports Club  and Maziya S&RC as a part of pre-season camp in Maldives, but later cancelled.

Friendly

Competitions

Overview

Federation Cup

Group stage

Group C

Knockout phage

Premier League

League table

Results summary

Results by round

Matches

AFC CUP

Group stage

Group D

Statistics

Goalscorers

Source: Matches

References

Bashundhara Kings
Bangladeshi football club records and statistics
2020 in Bangladeshi football
2021 in Bangladeshi football